Innocence Surround is the debut release by American metalcore band Confide, released in June 2005.

Background
Only one of the members of this release was still part of the band until the time of Confide's break-up, which was Jeffrey Helberg. Aside from this, Helberg and two other Confide members (William "Billy" Pruden and Aaron VanZutphen) that played on this release stayed a part of the band up until the Shout the Truth recording.

Track listing

Personnel
Josh Plesh – Lead vocals
Aaron VanZutphen – Lead guitar, clean vocals
Jeffrey Helberg – Rhythm guitar, backing vocals
William 'Billy' Pruden – Bass
Jason Pickard – Drums

References

2005 debut EPs
Confide (band) albums
Self-released EPs